Alsen is an unincorporated community in East Baton Rouge Parish, Louisiana, United States.

History
The community was founded in 1872 by an agency of the United States Department of War known as the Freedmen's Bureau designed to help freedmen in the aftermath of the American Civil War.

Notable people
Jeremy Richardson, an NBA basketball player.
Henry Gray, blues piano player and singer.

References

Unincorporated communities in East Baton Rouge Parish, Louisiana
Unincorporated communities in Louisiana